Ragama Cricket Club are a first-class cricket team based in Ragama, Sri Lanka. Their home ground is the Free Trade Zone Sports Complex.

History
Ragama Cricket Club was formed in 1989. It achieved promotion to first-class status in 2001.

At the start of 2018 Ragama had played 165 first-class matches, for 43 wins, 34 losses and 88 draws.

Current squad
Players with international caps are listed in bold

Honours

Records
Ragama's highest score is 318 by Udara Jayasundera against Sinhalese Sports Club in 2015–16. The best bowling figures are 8 for 29 by Upul Indrasiri against Saracens Sports Club in 2006–07.

Partnership records
 1st –	216  DA Ranatunga & HGSP Fernando	
 2nd – 161  PHD Premadasa & EFMU Fernando	
 3rd – 143  SA Perera & SI de Saram	
 4th – 255  EFMU Fernando & KAS Jayasinghe	
 5th – 188  WDDS Perera & EFMU Fernando	
 6th – 191  EFMU Fernando & S Arangalla	
 7th – 142  S Arangalla & KNS Fernando	
 8th – 109  KNS Fernando & S Chandana	
 9th – 79   ED Diaz & RD Dissanayake	
 10th – 63  SA Perera & SADU Indrasiri

References

External links
 Ragama CC website
 Ragama Cricket Club at CricketArchive
 Partnership records at CricketArchive
 batsman.com

Sri Lankan first-class cricket teams